The 2014 Phillip Island Superbike World Championship round was the first round of the 2014 Superbike World Championship. It took place over the weekend of 21–23 February 2014 at the Phillip Island Grand Prix Circuit near Cowes, Victoria, Australia.

Superbike race

Race 1 classification

Race 2 classification
The race was stopped after 14 laps.

Supersport

Race classification
The race was stopped after seven laps and restarted over a distance of five laps.

Standings after the race

Riders' Championship standings

Manufacturers' Championship standings

External links
 The official website of the Superbike World Championship

Motorsport at Phillip Island
Phillip Island
Phillip Island